Por Intharapalit was the pen name of Pricha Intharapalit (12 May 1910 – 25 September 1968), a Thai humorist and writer. Among his works was the Samgler series of comic short stories, of which he wrote nearly 2,000. He also wrote a novelisation of the battle of Bang Rajan. These works have been cited by Thai scholars among the 100 books that must be read by Thais.

The first book in the Samgler series, Ai Phuying, was written in 1938, and it became an instant best-seller, selling 20,000 copies in its first week. The stories are about three playboy friends and their families.

The stories are viewed by historians and literary experts as a glimpse of Bangkok society from 1938 to 1968, because they mention the real-life restaurants, nightclubs and celebrities who were popular at the time.

References

External links
 Samgler.org

1910 births
1968 deaths
20th-century male writers
20th-century short story writers
Por Intharapalit
Por Intharapalit
Por Intharapalit
Por Intharapalit
Por Intharapalit